Bennie Gene Adkins (February 1, 1934 – April 17, 2020) was a United States Army soldier and recipient of the U.S. military's highest decoration, the Medal of Honor, for his actions during the Vietnam War. In March 1966 Adkins distinguished himself during a 38-hour close-combat battle against North Vietnamese Army forces during the Battle of A Shau. At the time of the cited action, Adkins was a sergeant first class serving as an Intelligence Sergeant with Detachment A-102, 5th Special Forces Group, 1st Special Forces.

Biography
Adkins was born in Waurika, Oklahoma, and was drafted in 1956. He was assigned to a garrison unit in Germany, with a follow-on assignment to the 2nd Infantry Division, Fort Benning, Georgia. After attending Airborne School, he volunteered for Special Forces in 1961, serving with Special Forces for more than 13 years with the 7th, 3rd, 6th and 5th Special Forces Groups (Airborne). During that time he deployed to the Republic of Vietnam three times between 1963 and 1971. In April 1967, Adkins was awarded the Distinguished Service Cross for his actions with Detachment A-102 during his second tour in Vietnam. After Vietnam, Adkins was assigned to Fort Huachuca. Graduating in the third class of the Sergeant Major Academy, he returned to the Special Forces at Fort Bragg, then went to Fort Sherman and led training at its Jungle Operations Training Center. Adkins finally retired from the Army in 1978.

After the Army, Adkins earned a bachelor's and two master's degrees from Troy State University. He operated his own accounting company, and taught classes at Southern Union Junior College and Auburn University.  On May 12, 2017, Troy University Chancellor Jack Hawkins, Jr. awarded Adkins  an honorary doctorate of laws.

In March 2020, Adkins was hospitalized with COVID-19. He was admitted to the intensive care unit and put on a ventilator after experiencing respiratory failure. He died from complications of the virus on April 17, 2020, at the age of 86. Adkins was buried at Arlington National Cemetery on December 16, 2020.

Medal of Honor award

From 2002, the U.S. Army reviewed all 6,500 recipients of the Distinguished Service Cross to see if any recipients had actually performed actions worthy of the Medal of Honor; this led to two dozen medal upgrades in March 2014. In 2013, as part of the National Defense Authorization Act for Fiscal Year 2014, the Senate Armed Service Committee passed a provision removing the time limit for Donald P. Sloat and Adkins. On September 15, 2014, President Obama awarded the Medal of Honor to Adkins as an upgrade of his 1967 Distinguished Service Cross. During that ceremony, the Medal of Honor was awarded posthumously to Sloat and American Civil War army officer Alonzo Cushing. Adkins was also inducted into the Pentagon's Hall of Heroes.

Awards and decorations

Medal of Honor citation

Commendations

Adkins received the following awards:

See also

List of Medal of Honor recipients for the Vietnam War

References

External links

 Medal recipient killed up to 175 enemy troops, September 15, 2014, Brad Lendon, CNN

1934 births
2020 deaths
People from Waurika, Oklahoma
United States Army personnel of the Vietnam War
Auburn University faculty
Military personnel from Oklahoma
Troy University alumni
United States Army Medal of Honor recipients
United States Army soldiers
Vietnam War recipients of the Medal of Honor
Burials at Arlington National Cemetery
Deaths from the COVID-19 pandemic in Alabama